Profiling, the extrapolation of information about something, based on known qualities, may refer specifically to:

Technology
Profiling (information science) in information science
Profiling (computer programming) in software engineering
DNA profiling

Other
Author profiling
Data profiling
Forensic profiling, used in several types of forensic science
Offender profiling
Racial profiling
Sexual orientation profiling
Geographic profiling

See also
Profile (disambiguation)